Elizabeth Forbes may refer to:
Elizabeth Forbes (musicologist) (1924–2014), English author, music critic, and musicologist
Elizabeth Forbes (artist) (1859–1912), Canadian artist
Betty Forbes (1916–2002), New Zealand track and field athlete